The 1936 United States presidential election in Washington took place on November 3, 1936, as part of the 1936 United States presidential election. Voters chose eight representatives, or electors, to the Electoral College, who voted for president and vice president.

Washington was won by incumbent President Franklin D. Roosevelt (D–New York), running with Vice President John Nance Garner, with 66.38% of the popular vote, against Governor Alf Landon (R–Kansas), running with Frank Knox, with 29.88% of the popular vote.

FDR's 66.38 percent result is the best ever achieved by a Democratic presidential candidate in Washington state. , this is the last election in which Adams County voted for a Democratic presidential candidate. This would also prove the last time Whitman County voted for a Democratic presidential candidate until Bill Clinton in 1992, as well as the last time a presidential candidate won every single county in the state.

Results

Results by county

See also
 United States presidential elections in Washington (state)

References

Washington (state)
1936
1936 Washington (state) elections